Behringer is a German surname. Notable people with the surname include:

Jack Behringer (1925–2011), American coach
Melanie Behringer (born 1985), German footballer
Robert Behringer (1948–2018), American physicist
Wolfgang Behringer (born 1956), German historian

German-language surnames